Israel competed at the 2009 Summer Universiade also known as the XXV Summer Universiade, in Belgrade, Serbia.

Medals

Medals by sport

Gymnastics

Women's rhythmic gymnastics

Swimming

Men's

References

Summer Universiade
Nations at the 2009 Summer Universiade
Israel at the Summer Universiade